Christian Robert Honor (born 5 June 1968) is an English footballer, who played in the Football League for Bristol City, Torquay United, Hereford United, Swansea City and Cardiff City, and in the Scottish Football League for Airdrieonians and Partick Thistle. Honor played for Airdrieonians in the 1992 Scottish Cup Final, which they lost 2–1 to Rangers.

References

External links

1968 births
Living people
English footballers
Association football defenders
Bristol City F.C. players
Torquay United F.C. players
Hereford United F.C. players
Swansea City A.F.C. players
Airdrieonians F.C. (1878) players
Cardiff City F.C. players
Slough Town F.C. players
Bath City F.C. players
Partick Thistle F.C. players
Forest Green Rovers F.C. players
Scottish Football League players
English Football League players
Footballers from Bristol
hes a sweet one trust